Vinay Kumar Pandey (born 18 June 1964) was a member of the 15th Lok Sabha of India. He represented the Shrawasti constituency of Uttar Pradesh and is a member of the Indian National Congress political party.

Education and background
Pandey was born in Mankapur, Gonda (Uttar Pradesh). He holds PhD in Paleobotany. Pandey also holds Postgraduate diploma in Computer science, Ayurved Ratna and a certificate course in Processing and Cultivation of Aeromatic and Medicinal Plants.

Posts held

See also

List of members of the 15th Lok Sabha of India
Politics of India
Parliament of India
Government of India

References 

India MPs 2009–2014
Living people
1964 births
Indian National Congress politicians
People from Gonda district
Uttar Pradesh MLAs 1993–1996
Uttar Pradesh MLAs 1997–2002
Lok Sabha members from Uttar Pradesh
People from Balrampur
United Progressive Alliance candidates in the 2014 Indian general election
People from Shravasti district